Serrano is a surname common in the Spanish, Portuguese, and Italian languages.

Notable people
Amanda Serrano, Puerto Rican boxer
Ana Serrano, artist
Ana Serrano Redonnet, Argentine composer
Andres Serrano, American photographer
Antonio Serrano, Mexican film writer-director
 Antonio Serrano, Spanish long-distance runner
 Antonio Serrano, Peruvian football striker
 Boni Serrano, Filipino veteran of the Korean War
Carla Heredia Serrano, Ecuadorian chess player
Cindy Serrano, Puerto Rican boxer
Dave Serrano (born 1964), American college baseball coach
David Serrano Sobral (born 1986), Portuguese astrophysicist
 Eduardo Serrano (musician) (1911–2008), Venezuelan musician
 Eduardo Serrano (actor) (born 1942), Venezuelan actor
Elba Serrano, Puerto Rican neuroscientist
Eva Serrano, French gymnast
Felix Serrano, American comic book artist
Francho Serrano (born 2001), Spanish footballer
Francisco J. Serrano, Mexican civil engineer and architect
Francisco Serrano y Domínguez, Duke de la Torre, Spanish marshal and statesman
Irma Serrano, Mexican actress
Ismael Serrano, Spanish Singer/Songwriter
J. Francisco Serrano Cacho, Mexican architect
Jorge Serrano Elías, President of Guatemala
José Enrique Serrano, Democrat, U.S. House of Representatives
José Serrano (composer), Spanish composer of zarzuelas
José António Serrano, Portuguese physician
José Manuel Serrano, Spanish footballer
José Mariano Serrano, Bolivian member of the Congress of Tucumán
Joseph Serrano, Puerto Rican boxer
Juan Serrano, sixteenth-century Portuguese navigator
Juan Serrano (Flamenco), Spanish flamenco guitarist
Juan René Serrano, Mexican archer
Julian Serrano, Spanish-American chef
Mary J. Serrano, a writer, poet and translator
Miguel Serrano, Chilean diplomat and writer
Nestor Serrano, American actor
Nina Serrano, American poet and storyteller
Pedro Serrano (police officer), New York City police officer
Pedro Serrano (sailor), sixteenth-century Spanish sailor
Ramón Serrano Súñer, Spanish politician
Roberto Serrano, American economist
Rosana Serrano, Cuban rower
, Spanish linguist and author

Fictional characters
Heris Serrano, the central character in the Familias Regnant books

See also
Serano

Italian-language surnames
Portuguese-language surnames
Spanish-language surnames